Gio Mai is a commune of Quảng Trị Province, Vietnam.  The commune is divided into three villages: Mai Xá, Mai Thi, Lâm Xuân.

Communes of Quảng Trị province